"Serendipity" is a song by South Korean boy band BTS, sung as a solo by member Jimin. It was originally released digitally as an introductory song on September 8, 2017 in the extended play Love Yourself: Her, with the full length edition of the song being released on August 24, 2018 in Love Yourself: Answer. It was written by "hitman" bang, Ashton Foster, Ray Michael Djan Jr., RM, and Slow Rabbit, who was also credited as the producer.

Background and release 
According to writer Ray Michael Djan Jr., "Serendipity" started out as a deep, meaningful paragraph. The producers concentrated on making a strong melody for the song as usually the lyrics are changed from English to Korean.

When the trailer was released both "Jimin" and "Serendipity" trended worldwide. In a V Live broadcast, RM revealed Jimin's goal with the song was to "push himself as a vocalist" resulting in him coming to RM for advice. RM also showed a snippet of his version. When the music video was released it garnered over seven million views and one million likes in twenty-four hours.

Promotion 
The music video was released as a teaser for the upcoming EP Love Yourself: Her. The song was promoted at the 2018 KBS Song Festival in December 2018.

Music video 
The music video was directed by Choi Yongseok and Lee Wonju of Lumpens, with the choreography for the song created by Brian Puspos, who had worked with BTS before on "Butterfly".

Composition 
Musically, the song has been described as sensual and soothing, with hints of delicate electronic-tinged R&B in it. The genre was termed Alternative R&B by Billboard, with the intro version running 2:20 and the full version being 4:36. It is in the key of A♭ major and is eighty-seven beats per minute. With gender neutral lyrics it talked about following your dreams, love, identity, and purpose.

Reception 
"Serendipity" received critical acclaim, with IZM stating "'Serendipity' has a dreamlike quality to it, unraveling the joy, conviction, and curiosity of love". Chester Chin from star2 stated the song was a "soft and sensual ballad [and] an exquisite display of the group's maturity". The intro version of the song sold 114,128 digital copies in South Korea, with the full length version peaking at number twenty-nine for digital sales in the United States and selling more than 10,000 copies. In Canada, the full length version was the thirty-ninth best selling song upon release and was the eighth best seller worldwide.

Credits and personnel 
The song's credits are adapted from the CD liner notes of Love Yourself: Answer.

Slow Rabbit - Producer, Keyboard, Synthesizer, Vocal Arrangement, Recording Engineer @ Carrot Express
Ray Michael Djan Jr - Producer
Ashton Foster- Producer
RM - Producer
"hitman" bang - Producer
Pdogg - Additional Programming
JUNE - Chorus
ADORA - Chorus, Recording Engineer @ Adorable Trap
Kim Seunghyeon - Guitar
Jeong Wooyeong - Recording Engineer @ Big Hit Studio
Yang Ga - Mix Engineer @ Big Hit Studio

Achievements

Intro version 
 Charted at 29th place on UK's Official Charts
 Debuted with more than 10,000 sales in Billboards World Digital Song sales chart

Full length version

Charts

Intro Edition

Full Length Edition

Release history

References 

BTS songs
2017 songs
Songs written by Bang Si-hyuk
Songs written by Slow Rabbit
Music videos directed by Lumpens
Contemporary R&B ballads
2010s ballads
Songs written by RM (rapper)